Newville is a small unincorporated community in the southern portion of Prince George County, Virginia, United States.

References

Unincorporated communities in Prince George County, Virginia
Unincorporated communities in Virginia